Monday.com (styled in lowercase as monday.com) is a cloud-based platform that allows users to create their own applications and project management software. The product was launched in 2014 and in July 2019, the company raised $150 million, based on a $1.9 billion valuation. The company went public in June 2021 and is based in Tel Aviv, Israel.

History
Monday.com was founded in 2012 by Roy Mann, Eran Kampf and Eran Zinman. By August of that year, the company, then called dapulse, raised $1.5 million in seed funding. The product was commercially launched in 2014. In June 2016, the company announced the closing of $7.6 million in a Series A round. The round was led by Genesis Partners, with participation from existing backer Entrée Capital. In April 2017, the company raised $25 million. The round was led by New York-based firm Insight Venture Partners, with participation from existing Series A investors Genesis Partners and Entrée Capital. In November 2017, the company changed its brand name from dapulse to Monday.com.

In July 2018, the company raised a $50 million Series C funding round. The round was led by New York-based growth equity firm, Stripes Group, with participation from existing Series A and B investors, Insight Venture Partners and Entrée Capital. In July 2019, the company announced it raised a $150 million Series D round, bringing total funding to $234.1 million. The round was led by Sapphire Ventures with participation from Hamilton Lane, HarbourVest Partners, ION Crossover Partners and Vintage Investment Partners. The funding gave the company a valuation of $1.9 billion, making it a unicorn. As of 2021, the company reported over it was serving 127,000 customers across over 200 business verticals. In May 2020, the company won the 2020 Webby Award for Productivity in the category Apps, Mobile & Voice. In May 2021, the company filed for a U.S. IPO. The company went public on June 10, 2021.

Product
Monday.com is a customizable web and mobile work management platform, designed to help teams and organizations with operational efficiency by tracking projects and workflows, visualizing data, and team collaboration. It includes automation capabilities and supports integrations with other work apps.

API
Version 1 of Monday.com's API is a REST-based JSON API capable of handling cross-origin resource sharing (CORS) requests and uses an API Token as authentication.

Version 2 of their API is a GraphQL API that allows users to pull and/or alter data about users, updates, items, boards, tags and more.

In June 2020, Monday.com released its API to third-party developers. Monday.com's open API allows customers, partners or any third-party developer to build on top of the platform and extend its capabilities to fit the needs of different teams and organizations. Common use cases include custom views, dashboard widgets, automations, and integrations with other work apps.

References

External links
 

Software companies established in 2012
2012 establishments in Israel
Software companies of Israel
Collaborative software
Project management software
Task management software
Israeli brands
Companies based in Tel Aviv
2021 initial public offerings
Companies listed on the Nasdaq